The 1840 United States presidential election in Vermont took place between October 30 and December 2, 1840, as part of the 1840 United States presidential election. Voters chose seven representatives, or electors to the Electoral College, who voted for President and Vice President.

Vermont voted for the Whig candidate, William Henry Harrison, over Democratic candidate Martin Van Buren. Harrison won Vermont by a margin of 28.43%.

Harrison's 28.43% margin of victory made it his strongest victory in the election while he carried 63.90% of the popular vote made Vermont his second strongest state after Kentucky.

Harrison had previously won the Green Mountain State against Van Buren four years earlier.

Results

See also
 United States presidential elections in Vermont

References

Vermont
1840
1840 Vermont elections